Wielki Staw Polski (Polish: Wielki Staw Polski; Slovakian: Veľký stav; German: Großer Polnischer See; Hungarian: Nagy-tó) - is a tarn located in the High Tatras, at an elevation of 1,665 metres above sea level in the Valley of the Five Polish Lakes (Dolina Pięciu Stawów Polskich), by the slope of the Miedziane. The lake is the second-largest lake by area in the Tatra Mountains after the Morskie Oko. The lake is located in the Lesser Poland Voivodeship; in Poland.

Wielki Staw Polski is the deepest and longest (998 metres) lake in the Tatra Mountains, and the third-deepest lake in Poland (the deepest lake is Hańcza. The lake's volume is around 13 million m³ of water, and it is the largest lake by volume in the Tatra Mountains (its volume makes up one third of all lakes in the Tatra Mountains lakes).

References

Lakes of Poland
Lakes of Lesser Poland Voivodeship
Lakes of the High Tatras